Hyperolius endjami is a species of frog in the family Hyperoliidae.
It is endemic to Cameroon.
Its natural habitats are subtropical or tropical moist lowland forests, subtropical or tropical swamps, subtropical or tropical moist montane forests, shrub-dominated wetlands, freshwater marshes, and intermittent freshwater marshes.
It is threatened by habitat loss.

References

endjami
Endemic fauna of Cameroon
Amphibians described in 1980
Taxonomy articles created by Polbot